White Flint Mall was a shopping mall, located along Rockville Pike, in Montgomery County, Maryland, that closed in early 2015 and demolished thereafter. Its former anchors were Lord & Taylor, Bloomingdale's, Dave & Buster's, H&M, Loews Theatre and Borders Books and Music, the last four of which acted as junior anchors for the mall. Lord & Taylor, the mall's final anchor, operated until 2020, five years after the mall's initial closure and demolition.

History

Early years
The mall opened in 1977 and was initially anchored by Lord & Taylor and the second Bloomingdale's location in the Washington, D.C. area (after Tysons Corner Center). A third anchor, I. Magnin (the sole East Coast branch of the chain), opened shortly thereafter and closed in 1992. Borders Books and Music took over the I. Magnin location in 1993, closing in 2011. I. Magnin was only on levels 2 and 3 while Lord & Taylor was on levels 1 and 2. Raleigh Haberdasher also had a suburban branch at the center.

Some shopping areas revolved around motifs: Georgetown, on the third floor and Via Rialto on the ground floor, which were recreations of the urban districts in Washington and Venice respectively. The latter was a block of shops and restaurants stretching from the center court to the main entrance facing Rockville Pike, where Bertucci's and Cheesecake Factory later stood. Both Georgetown and Restaurant Row, home in the 1970s to Intermission Nightclub and Dining Disco, the first shopping-mall discotheque in the country, were replaced by Dave & Buster's in 1996. Other restaurants and fast food vendors populated the mall including the food court The Eatery, which went from a darker earth tone color motif to bright neon in the 1980s as well as the third-floor loft overlooking the center court.

Later years
The mall found creative ways to promote itself over the years. It was the first mall to issue its own credit card to frequent shoppers. To celebrate its 25th anniversary, the mall released its own Monopoly game entitled "White Flint-opoly".

Three decorative water features were located on the first level of the center. The largest was a fountain underneath and around the mirrored escalators, loosely based on the Rialto Bridge and Grand Canal in Venice, in the Via Rialto mall within a mall. This fountain was low to the ground, which made it prone to children falling in, causing it to be removed when I. Magnin closed. Two identical fountains were in center court, one in front of each glass elevator, and were removed during a 2004 mall facelift. One oddity about the closure of Borders on April 17, 2011, was the sign that remained in front of the escalator leading to its permanently shuttered entrance that read "Temporarily Out of Service". Over the years major celebrities have appeared at the mall like Donna Karan and Elizabeth Taylor, as well as minor and local stars like the cast of MTV's The Real World: D.C., Brigitte Burdine, Andrea Mitchell, Paula Marshall, Giuliana Rancic and Christine Blasey Ford.

The mall's impact was felt throughout the metro area in places such as Prince George's County which lacked any regional shopping centers as upscale as White Flint. This led to some spots like Landover Mall and Iverson Mall receiving the nickname "Black Flint Mall", while alternately White Flint was dubbed the "White Iverson Mall".

White Flint was a popular destination on Halloween, known for its annual "Howl-O-Ween" event with special trick-or-treating and hosting children's magic shows performed by area entertainers including The Great Zucchini and Dean Carnegie among others.

The mall was served by the White Flint station (renamed North Bethesda station after the mall was demolished) on the Red Line of the Washington Metro since 1984.

Demolition and redevelopment

In November 2011, Lerner Enterprises announced plans to deconstruct the  mall and its large parking deck and replace it with four office buildings, a 300-room hotel,  of retail and restaurant space, and 12 apartment buildings consisting of a total of 2,500 residences. The developers expected construction to begin two years following approval and take approximately 25 years to be fully completed.

On January 5, 2012, Macy's Inc. announced that the mall's Bloomingdale's store would close in March 2012. Bloomingdale's closed on March 14, 2012, and the building it occupied was demolished in 2013 prior to the mall's closure. On August 7, 2013, The Cheesecake Factory announced they would leave their White Flint location and move to nearby Westfield Montgomery; it closed in December 2013. On December 24, 2013, WJLA-TV reported that White Flint Mall would permanently close sometime in 2014. At that time, fewer than 20 stores were still open including Lord and Taylor, P. F. Chang's China Bistro, Dave & Buster's, Pottery Barn, Loews Cinemas, Banana Republic, and H & M. On January 20, 2014, Loews Cinemas permanently closed their theater. On August 13, 2014, Dave & Buster's was evicted and was forced to close, leaving only Lord and Taylor, P. F. Chang's China Bistro, and a jewelry store. The jewelry store closed in October 2014, and P. F. Chang's China Bistro closed January 4, 2015, the same day the mall closed for good.

Contractors began the exterior demolition of the mall, beginning with the southeastern parking garage nearest to the former Bloomingdale's store site, on July 7, 2015. Demolition of the actual mall building and the remaining parking garages, except the one connected to Lord & Taylor, was finished in January 2016.

It was originally planned that Lord & Taylor would remain through the redevelopment process, however, they were involved in litigation with the mall beginning in July 2013, and went to trial to seek damages on July 28, 2015. On August 14, 2015, the court ruled that White Flint owed Lord & Taylor $31,000,000. White Flint appealed the court's decision; the Fourth Circuit Court of Appeals unanimously upheld the previous verdict in favor of Lord & Taylor, stating that the mall's owners' breached their 1975 contract with Lord & Taylor to maintain the property as a "first-class" mall until 2042. The appeals court ruled that mall's owners "could not establish to a 'reasonable certainty' whether and to what extent Lord & Taylor would benefit from the redevelopment". The opinion also noted the mall's owners failed to provide the jury with a clear picture of when the new town center would be built, how many buildings it would include and what types of businesses would be expected to lease space in it. The appeals court ruled that the $31,000,000 was a reasonable estimation of lost profits and future construction costs to reconfigure the store. However, this never came to pass, as on August 2, 2020, it was announced that Lord & Taylor would close (later in the same month, it was announced that all of their 38 stores would close). The store closed on December 28, 2020.

The mall's original site was one of multiple locations in the Washington metropolitan area competing to be Amazon's second headquarters. Ultimately, the second headquarters was awarded to New York City and Crystal City, Virginia, allowing Lerner to continue its original redevelopment plans.

Former anchors and tenants
 Bertucci's
 Bloomingdale's (opened in 1977 with the mall, closed March 14, 2012)
 Borders Books & Music (formerly I. Magnin, opened 1993, closed 2011)
 Dave & Buster's (evicted August 13, 2014)
 H&M (closed 2014)
 I. Magnin (opened shortly after the mall, closed 1992 and replaced by Borders in 1993)
 Loews Theatres (closed January 20, 2014)
 Lord & Taylor (opened in 1977 with the mall, closed December 28, 2020)
 PF Chang's China Bistro (closed January 4, 2015 with the mall)
 The Cheesecake Factory (closed in December 2013)

References

External links

White Flint Mall website archive
Lerner Enterprises page on White Flint Mall

Shopping malls established in 1977
Shopping malls disestablished in 2015
Shopping malls in Maryland
Defunct shopping malls in the United States
Demolished shopping malls in the United States
North Bethesda, Maryland
Demolished buildings and structures in Maryland
Buildings and structures demolished in 2015